No Coast Jazz is an album by saxophonist John Handy III featuring tracks recorded in 1960 and originally released on the Roulette label.

Reception

AllMusic awarded the album 3 stars and its review by Scott Yanow states, "The inside/outside music (advanced hard bop that sometimes hints at the avant-garde) still sounds quite fresh".

Track listing
All compositions by John Handy III
 "To Randy" - 6:16
 "Tales of Paradise" - 4:53
 "Boo's Ups and Downs" - 8:15
 "Hi Number" - 6:59
 "Pretty Side Avenue" - 5:29
 "No Coast" - 6:29

Personnel 
John Handy III - alto saxophone
Don Friedman - piano
Bill Lee - bass
Lex Humphries - drums

References 

1960 albums
Albums produced by Teddy Reig
John Handy albums
Roulette Records albums